Kelly McCormack is a Canadian actor. She has worked in film, television, and on stage, and she runs her production company, Floyder Films.

She is best known for her portraying Zeph in the Syfy science fiction television series Killjoys and for her role as Betty Anne on the Crave series Letterkenny. She also stars as Jess McCready in the Amazon series A League of Their Own.

McCormack has written and starred in several independent feature films that have screened at film festivals around the world, including Play the Film (2013), Barn Wedding (2015), and Sugar Daddy (2020). She also starred in and produced the award-winning CBC mockumentary The Neddeaus of Duqesne Island.

Early life 
McCormack was born and raised in Vancouver, British Columbia. She has performed on stage since the age of seven and began her training as a performer in classical music and theatre. As a teenager, she studied at the Lyric School of Acting, Vancouver, before attending university first in England at Herstmonceux International Study Centre, where she studied literature, and later at the University of British Columbia.

Career 
After university, McCormack moved to New York City to study acting, musical theatre and experimental theatre and performed with The Flea Theatre Company as a member of The Bat Company, performing in Tony Award nominated Liz Swados' Kaspar Hauser. She later moved to Toronto and started working in the Toronto indie theatre scene with playwright Kat Sandler, originating roles in plays like Delicacy, and working in the entertainment industry.

Throughout the 2010s, she played a variety of supporting roles in a number of productions, including in the television series Defiance, 11.22.63, and Damien, as well as in the web series Teenagers and That's My DJ.

In 2013, she wrote her first feature film, Play the Film, in which she also starred. The film was produced for only $1,000. McCormack won several awards for writing the film, including Best Screenplay at the Broad Humor Film Festival. The following year, she wrote another feature film, Barn Wedding, which screened at film festivals throughout 2015.

In 2017, McCormack served as a producer and actress on several productions. In February of that year, she joined the cast of the Syfy science fiction television series Killjoys in its third season. On the series, she portrayed Zeph, an androgynous scientist, in a recurring role until the series ended.

That summer, the CBC mockumentary The Neddeaus of Duqesne Island, which McCormack both produced and starred in, was released online via CBC's official website. The series received three Canadian Screen Award nominations at the 6th Canadian Screen Awards in 2018.

In November 2017, she joined the cast for the third season of the CraveTV series Letterkenny. In early 2018, she appeared in an episode of the CBC comedy series Crawford. Later that year, she was featured in an episode of The Expanse.

On stage, McCormack has developed and performed in Charlotte: A Tri-Coloured Play With Music, an original opera based on the life of German painter Charlotte Salomon, which ran at the 2017 Luminato Festival in Toronto and at the World Stage Design Festival in Taipei.

In 2019, Kelly wrapped production of her latest feature film Sugar Daddy, which she wrote, produced, and starred in alongside Colm Feore and an ensemble cast that includes Amanda Brugel, Aaron Ashmore, Nicholas Campbell, Noam Jenkins, Ishan Davé, Tiio Horn, Jess Salgueiro, Tony Nappo, Rob Stewart, Michelle Morgan, and Broken Social Scene’s Brendan Canning. The film premiered at the 2020 Whistler Film Festival, where McCormack received an honorable mention for the Borsos Competition award for best performance in a Canadian film, and won the One to Watch award.

Activism 
McCormack has been vocal about her support of the #MeToo movement, and was invited to discuss the subject in an interview with CBC's q radio show.

Filmography

Film

Television

References

External links 
 

Living people
Writers from Vancouver
Canadian film actresses
Screenwriters from British Columbia
Canadian television actresses
Actresses from Vancouver
Year of birth missing (living people)
21st-century Canadian actresses